Susan Earner is a camogie player, a member of the Galway senior panel that unsuccessfully contested the All Ireland finals of 2010 and 2011 against Wexford, She won a Camogie  All Star Award in 2011. She was part of the Galway team which won the 2013 All Ireland, defeating Kilkenny in the final.

School and College
Born in Clonfert, Co Galway near where the Shannon forms the border between Galway and Offaly, she attended St. Rynagh's, Banagher, captaining the school team to the All Ireland in 2004, and NUI Galway from where she graduated in 2008. More recently, Ms. Earner has graduated from University College Cork with her Higher Diploma in Education. She is now a qualified secondary school teacher in French and Geography and teaching locally. She is currently learning spoken and written Welsh. Now teaching in Ard scoil chiarain where she is very happy she trains the senior girls team, where they have reached a quarter final thanks to her hard work, time and patience

Other awards
National Camogie League 2005, Senior Gael Linn Cup 2008, All Ireland Intermediate medal 2004, Junior League 2003, Junior All Ireland 2003, All Ireland Minor 2000. Galway player of the year 2003, All Ireland senior Secondary school medal.

Susan also holds the record for the donkey derby held each year at the Ballinasloe Horse Fair. In 2007 she rode "Bridges Bullet" to victory in a record time of 4 minutes 22 seconds.

References

External links
 Camogie.ie Official Camogie Association Website

1986 births
Living people
Camogie goalkeepers
Galway camogie players
UCC camogie players